The money dance, dollar dance, or apron dance is an event at some wedding receptions in various cultures.  During a money dance, male guests pay to dance briefly with the bride, and sometimes female guests pay to dance with the groom.

Sometimes guests are told that the money will be used for the bride and groom's honeymoon or to give them a little extra cash with which to set up housekeeping.

Europe

Poland 
The money dance may have originated in Poland around the beginning of the 20th century. The dance takes place some time after the first dance, often once guests have had a chance to have a few drinks. The best man or MC or the disc jockey announces the event. Customarily, the best man begins dancing with the bride, pinning money onto her wedding gown or putting it into a purse, which she carries especially for the purpose, or into the pockets of an apron she dons over her gown, especially for this dance. In a more contemporary version of this custom, the dance includes bridesmaids and other ladies who dance.

Ukraine 
At Ukrainian weddings, the father of the bride usually begins pinning money on her dress. He is followed by the best man and groomsmen, and, finally, by the remainder of the male guests. Another variation is where the bride's veil is removed and given to the maid of honor and an apron is placed on the bride. Money is then placed into her apron during the dance.

Balkan 
In Balkan countries (Bosnia, Serbia,...) weddings, instead of pinning the money on the bride's gown, the male guests give the money to the best man for safe keeping.

Hungary 
At Hungarian weddings, the bride takes off her shoes and puts them in the middle of the dance floor. Then her shoes are passed around from guest to guest and each deposits a contribution.

Africa

Nigeria
Money spraying is an integral part of the Yoruba people of Nigeria. They are very flamboyant and appreciate the essence of life and every success in merriment. Other tribes in Nigeria described them as party loving people. Money spraying symbolizes a showering of happiness, good fortune and a display of the guest's affection for the couple. The bride and groom are ushered in and dance behind the wedding party. Guests encircle the couple on the dance floor and come forward, placing bills on the couple's forehead or side of their chest allowing them to “rain down.” 

“At a Nigerian wedding reception, the bride and groom are dressed in traditional attire,” “For the Yoruba Ethnic Group, the bride wears Iro and Buba and the groom wears an Agbada. As the money is sprayed, 'collectors’ take the cash from the floor and place in bags for the couple.”

North America

Mexico 
Relatives take turns dancing up to the bride and groom and pinning money on their clothes, which allows the couple to spend a few moments with each of their guests.  After the money dance, the groom is ridiculed by his friends, tossed in the air while being covered with the veil, and given an apron and broom.

United States and Canada
In United States and Canada (including Puerto Rico), the practice of a money dance varies by geographic region and ethnic background of the families involved. It typically involves guests giving small sums of cash to the bride or pinning cash to her gown or veil.  Sometimes the money is placed in an apron or pouch held by the maid of honor or a female relative, and the best man gives shots of whiskey to participants before the dance.

Some consider this a way for the bride and groom to have face time with their guests and to wish them luck. Any guest has the opportunity to dance with the bride or groom for 30–60 seconds. Sometimes couples keep the money outright, while some may save it for their firstborn child.

The Philippines 
A feature of some Filipino weddings is the money dance. Men line up in front of the bride and pin money to her dress or veil, then dance with her. The same sequence occurs with the groom; women line up in front of him and pin money to his clothing. Money pinned or taped onto the new married couple's garments represents a wish that good fortune be "rained" upon them, and is also a means of helping the couple financially as they begin their life together.

See also
 Wedding traditions and customs

References 

Dance culture
Wedding traditions